Sir Alexander Thomson, PC, FRS (1744? – 15 April 1817) was an English barrister and judge. He was Chief Baron of the Exchequer from 1814 until his death three years later.

Biography 
Of unknown parentage, Thomson was born and educated in Wolverhampton. He was entered at Lincoln's Inn in 1764 and called to the Bar in 1769. He practiced in Chancery, mostly as an equity draftsman. He came to the notice of John Russell, 4th Duke of Bedford, who appointed him auditor of his estates.

A close friend of Lord Chancellor Thurlow, Thomson was appointed a Master in Chancery in 1782, Accountant-General in 1786, and a Baron of the Exchequer in 1787; he was made a serjeant and knighted the same year. He had been elected a Bencher of Lincoln's Inn in 1782. In 1786 he was elected FRS.

In 1814, Thomson succeeded Sir Vicary Gibbs as Chief Baron of the Exchequer, and was sworn of the Privy Council. He died 1817. Unmarried and having been predeceased by his sister in whose favour his will was made, his death led to a lawsuit in chancery.

References 

 https://www.oxforddnb.com/view/10.1093/ref:odnb/9780198614128.001.0001/odnb-9780198614128-e-63081
https://catalogues.royalsociety.org/CalmView/Record.aspx?src=CalmView.Persons&id=NA2723

Knights Bachelor
1817 deaths
Chief Barons of the Exchequer
Barons of the Exchequer
People from Wolverhampton
Members of Lincoln's Inn
Serjeants-at-law (England)
Members of the Privy Council of the United Kingdom
Fellows of the Royal Society